Aerolift was a South African airline based in Bryanston, Gauteng, Johannesburg, operating chartered passenger and cargo flights within Africa using Soviet-built aircraft.  Aerolift also offered aircraft lease services. The airline was launched in 2002 and shut down in 2009 following two fatal accidents that had occurred in the same year.

Fleet 
Upon closure, the Aerolift fleet included the following aircraft:

1 Antonov An-12
1 Antonov An-26
1 Antonov An-32
1 Antonov An-72
1 Antonov An-124
1 Ilyushin Il-76
1 Lockheed Tristar

Accidents and incidents

On 20 February 2009, an Aerolift Antonov An-12 crashed upon take-off at Luxor International Airport, Egypt due to an engine fire, killing all five crew members on board.
On March 9, 2009 Aerolift Ilyushin Il-76 S9-SAB crashed into Lake Victoria just after takeoff from Entebbe Airport, Uganda, killing all 11 people on board. Two of the engines had caught fire on take-off. The aircraft had been chartered by Dynacorp on behalf of AMISOM. The accident was investigated by Uganda's Ministry of Transport, which concluded that all four engines were time-expired and that Aerolift's claim that maintenance had been performed which extended their service live and that the work had been certified could not be substantiated.

References 

Defunct airlines of South Africa
Defunct cargo airlines
Airlines established in 2002
Airlines disestablished in 2009
2002 establishments in South Africa
2009 disestablishments in South Africa
Cargo airlines of South Africa
Companies based in Johannesburg